Raymond Slater (22 August 1931 – October 2005) was an English professional footballer who played in the Football League as a forward.

References

1931 births
2005 deaths
Sportspeople from Tynemouth
Footballers from Tyne and Wear
English footballers
Association football forwards
South Shields F.C. (1936) players
Chesterfield F.C. players
Gateshead F.C. players
Blyth Spartans A.F.C. players
English Football League players